Water polo at the 1964 Summer Olympics was held at the Yoyogi National Gymnasium in Shibuya, Tokyo. The gymnasium was built in 1961-1964 as the first indoor pool for Olympic water polo; it also hosted all swimming and diving events and could accommodate over 13,000 people.

In the water polo tournament, two teams from each of the four preliminary groups advanced to two semi-finals, and their four winners competed for the medals. The scores from preliminary rounds were taken into account in the semifinals, and the scores from the semifinals were taken into account in the finals.

Squads

Medal summary

Results

First round

Group A

Group B

Group C

Group D

Semifinals

Semifinal AB

Semifinal CD

Final round

Classification 5–8

Final

References

Sources
 PDF documents in the LA84 Foundation Digital Library:
 Official Report of the 1964 Olympic Games, v.2 (download, archive) (pp. 682–698)
 Water polo on the Olympedia website
 Water polo at the 1964 Summer Olympics (men's tournament)
 Water polo on the Sports Reference website
 Water polo at the 1964 Summer Games (men's tournament) (archived)

 
1964 Summer Olympics events
1964
1964 in water polo
1964